The 2020–21 Southeastern Louisiana Lions basketball team represented Southeastern Louisiana University during the 2020–21 NCAA Division I men's basketball season. The Lions were led by second-year head coach David Kiefer, and played their home games at the University Center in Hammond, Louisiana as members of the Southland Conference. In a season limited due to the ongoing COVID-19 pandemic, the Lions finished the 2020–21 season 8–18, 5–10 in Southland play to finish in ninth place. They defeated McNeese State in the first round of the Southland tournament before losing to New Orleans.

Previous season 
The Lions finished the 2019–20 season 8–23, 5–15 in Southland play to finish in a tie for 11th place. They failed to qualify for the Southland tournament.

Roster

Schedule and results 

|-
!colspan=9 style=| Non-conference Regular season

|-
!colspan=9 style=| Southland Regular season

|-
!colspan=9 style=| Southland tournament

Source:

References 

Southeastern Louisiana
Southeastern Louisiana Lions basketball seasons
Southeastern Louisiana Lions basketball
Southeastern Louisiana Lions basketball